Two Shadows  is a narrative drama film released in 2012.  The film won the Audience Award, Cinematography Award and was nominated for the Grand Jury Award at the 2012 Los Angeles Asian Pacific Film Festival.  It is one of the first films to focus on Cambodian immigrants in the United States seeking surviving family connections in Cambodia since the fall of 1970s communist party, the Khmer Rouge.  The film is the second collaboration between director Gregory Cahill and actress Sophea Pel, following the 2006 short film The Golden Voice about Cambodian singer Ros Serey Sothear.  The film was shot primarily in Cambodia and also in Los Angeles, California.

Plot
Cambodian-American hipster wannabe Sovanna opens a cryptic letter from Cambodia claiming that her long-lost brother and sister are still alive.  She travels to her birthplace alone to seek out her two siblings who disappeared during the civil war 20 years earlier. Upon discovering a girl who may or may not be her real sister, Sovanna is ensnared into an increasingly dangerous situation, pitting her in a tug-of-war between her own personal safety, and her compassion for a stranger.

Accolades

References

External links
 
 

2012 films
2012 drama films
Films about Cambodian Americans
Khmer-language films
Films shot in Los Angeles
Cambodian-American culture
2012 multilingual films
Cambodian multilingual films
American multilingual films